Makoto Matsubara (born January 13, 1944) is a Japanese former professional baseball first baseman and third baseman in Nippon Professional Baseball (NPB). He played for the Taiyo Whales / Yokohama Taiyo Whales from 1962 to 1980 and the Yomiuri Giants in 1981.

References

1944 births
Living people
Japanese baseball players
Nippon Professional Baseball infielders
Taiyō Whales players
Yokohama Taiyō Whales players
Yomiuri Giants players
Japanese baseball coaches
Nippon Professional Baseball coaches